Virginia's 66th House of Delegates district elects one of 100 seats in the Virginia House of Delegates, the lower house of the state's bicameral legislature. District 66 represents the city of Colonial Heights as well as part of Chesterfield County. The seat has been held by Republican Mike Cherry since 2022.

Recent election results

2000s

2010s

List of delegates

References

Colonial Heights, Virginia
Government in Chesterfield County, Virginia
Virginia House of Delegates districts